St. Theresa Church, or St. Teresa's Church or variations, may refer to:

Canada 
 St. Theresa's Catholic Church (Ottawa)
 St. Teresa Roman Catholic Church, New Toronto, Etobicoke, Ontario

China
 St. Theresa's Church, Haining in Jiaxing, Zhejiang
 St. Teresa's Church, Hong Kong

Comoros 
 St. Theresa of the Child Jesus Church, Moroni

Denmark 
 St. Theresa's Church, Denmark, Copenhagen

Gibraltar 
 St. Theresa's Church, Gibraltar

India 
 Saint Theresa Church, Perambur, Chennai, Tamil Nadu
 St. Theresa of Lisieux Catholic Church, Vellayambalam, Kerala

Italy 
 Santa Teresa, Turin

Lithuania 
 Church of St. Theresa, Vilnius

Poland 
 Carmelite Church, Przemyśl

St. Kitts and Nevis 
 St. Theresa Church, Charlestown

Singapore 
 Church of St Teresa, Singapore

Sri Lanka 
 St Theresa's Church Colombo

United Kingdom 
 Church of St Teresa of Avila, Birkdale, Merseyside, England
 St Teresa of Avila Church, Chiddingfold, Surrey, England

United States
 Saint Teresa of Avila Church (Bodega, California)
 St. Theresa Church (Trumbull, Connecticut)
 Saint Theresa Catholic Church (Kekaha, Hawaii)
 Old St. Teresa Catholic Church, Albany, Georgia
 St. Teresa's Catholic Church (Hutchinson, Kansas)
 St. Theresa Roman Catholic Church (Rhodelia, Kentucky)
 Chapel of St. Theresa–the Little Flower, Detroit, Michigan
 St. Theresa of Avila Roman Catholic Church, Detroit, Michigan
 St. Teresa Church (Manhattan), New York
 St. Teresa of Avila Church (New York City), New York
 St. Teresa of the Infant Jesus's Church (Staten Island), New York
 St. Theresa of the Infant Jesus Church (Bronx), New York
 St. Theresa of Avila Catholic Church, Gonzales, Louisiana

See also 
 St. Theresa's Cathedral (disambiguation)
 Church of St. Thérèse of Lisieux (disambiguation)